Curry–Jones syndrome is a rare genetic disorder which is characterized by brain, osseous, cutaneous, ocular, ans intestinal anomalies associated with congenital minor physical anomalies.

Signs and symptoms 

Individuals with this condition usually have the following symptoms:

 One-sided coronal craniosynostosis
 Multiple suture synostosis
 Agenesis of the corpus callosum that can either be complete or partial
 Polysyndactyly, preaxial type
 Hand/foot syndactyly
 Pearl-white areas in the skin that are prone to being scarred and suffer from atrophy
 Eye, cheek and limb hair growth abnormalities
 Iris coloboma
 Microphthalmia
 Congenitally short gut
 Intestine malrotation
 Dysmotility
 Chronic constipation
 Intestinal bleeding
 Myofibroma

Additional findings that aren't seen as often as the other mentioned symptoms include:

 Developmental delays
 Variable intellectual disability
 Intraabdominal smooth muscle hamartomas
 Skin trichoblastoma
 Occipital meningoceles
 Desmoplastic medulloblastoma

Causes 

This condition is caused by a somatic mosaic missense mutation located in SMOH gene, in chromosome 7. These mutations are present in less than 50% of body tissues. It is suggested that the mutation occurs post-zygotically during early embryonic life.

Treatment 

Treatment is done on the symptoms the disorder causes.

Epidemiology 

According to OMIM, this condition has been described in 13 people worldwide.

Discovery 

It was first discovered in 1995 by Temple et al. when he described 5 unrelated children, some of which had been described previously by Cohen et al. (1988) and Gorlin et al. (1990). These children had defects of the skin, gastrointestinal tract, and skull associated with polysyndactyly.

References 

Genetic diseases and disorders